The rufous-backed wren (Campylorhynchus capistratus) is a songbird of the family Troglodytidae. It is a resident breeding species from southwest Mexico to northwestern Costa Rica.

Taxonomy and systematics

What is now the rufous-backed wren was previously treated as six of the eight subspecies of rufous-naped wren (Campylorhynchus rufinucha). A 2009 publication proposed that Campylorhynchus rufinucha (sensu lato) be split into three species and the International Ornithological Committee (IOC) accepted the splits. What had been C. r. humilis was elevated to species status as Sclater's wren. The reduced C. rufinucha received the new English name Veracruz wren and the other six subspecies became subspecies of rufous-backed wren.

BirdLife International (BLI) has implemented the split but retains the English name rufous-naped wren for C. rufinucha. However, the North American Classification Committee of the American Ornithological Society (NACC/AOS) and the Clements taxonomy have not accepted the split as of early 2021. 

The six subspecies of rufous-backed wren accepted by the IOC are:

C. c. nigricaudatus Nelson (1897)
C. c. capistratus Lesson (1842)
C. c. xerophilus Griscom (1930)
C. c. castaneus Ridgway (1888)
C. c. nicaraguae Miller, W. & Griscom (1925)
C. c. nicoyae Phillips (1986)

The last of these has not been accepted by the Clements taxonomy.

Description

There is some variation among the subspecies but generally they have a black crown and eyestripe separated by a white supercilium, a rufous nape, and cinnamon to chestnut upperparts streaked with black and white, especially on the rump. The wings and tail are barred with black and grayish-white. The underparts are white. Young birds have duller upperparts and buff underparts.

Distribution and habitat

The six subspecies of rufous-backed wren are found thus:

C. c. nigricaudatus, the Pacific coastal plain from southwestern Chiapas, Mexico into Guatemala
C. c. capistratus, the Pacific coastal plain from Guatemala south into El Salvador
C. c. xerophilus, the Motagua Valley of Guatemala
C. c. castaneus, interior Guatemala east to Honduras and Nicaragua
C. c. nicaraguae, interior of western Nicaragua
C. c. nicoyae, the Nicoya Peninsula of northwestern Costa Rica

It inhabits dry forest or open woodland, scrub, second growth and savanna, mainly on the Pacific side of the central mountain ranges.

Behavior

Feeding

The rufous-backed wren forages actively in low vegetation for insects and other invertebrates, in pairs or family groups. They have adapted to live near humans and sometimes take table scraps. When attempting to consume prey, they may thrash it around with their beak before eating.

Breeding

The rufous-backed wren's spherical nest has a side entrance and is lined with seed down. This species sometimes nests close to the nests of wasps and there is experimental evidence that those that do so are afforded substantial protection from predation. The female alone incubates the three to five brown- or black-spotted, white or greenish eggs for about two weeks until hatching, and the young fledge after about the same length of time again. After breeding, families sleep together in dormitory nests like those used for breeding.

Vocalization

The rufous-backed wren's songs vary somewhat among subspecies but the basic structure is 
"melodic, pure-tone syllables with multiple frequency changes combined into phrases."

Status

The IUCN has assessed the rufous-backed wren as being of Least Concern. "The population has not been quantified since the species was split" but "is suspected to be stable in the absence of evidence for any declines or substantial threats."

References

Other reading
 

Campylorhynchus
Birds of Central America
Birds of Guatemala
Birds of El Salvador
Birds of Honduras
Birds of Nicaragua
Birds of Costa Rica
Birds of Mexico
Birds described in 1842
Taxa named by René Lesson